Vallon-en-Sully is a commune in the Allier department in Auvergne-Rhône-Alpes in central France.

It is home to a host of beautiful châteaux (i.e. castles), with the most notable being Le Creux.

Population

See also
Communes of the Allier department

References

Communes of Allier
Allier communes articles needing translation from French Wikipedia